is a Japanese diversified retail group headquartered in Nibancho, Tokyo. Seven & I was founded in 1920 as Ito-Yokado, the Japanese chain of general merchandise and department stores. In 1991, Ito-Yokado acquired majority control of 7-Eleven, the American international chain of convenience stores. Seven & I was then established in 2005 as part of a corporate restructuring to serve as the holding company of 7-Eleven, Ito-Yokado, and its other business ventures. It was the fifteenth largest retailer in the world as of 2018.

History
The Ito-Yokado Japanese chain of grocery and clothing stores was founded in 1920. In the 1970s, Ito-Yokado became a Japanese franchisee of both the 7-Eleven international chain of convenience stores and the Denny's international chain of family restaurants. In 1990, the Southland Corporation, 7-Eleven's American parent company, filed for bankruptcy due to incurring debt, allowing Ito-Yokado to take over 70 percent of Southland in 1991. In 1999, Southland changed its name to 7-Eleven, Inc., citing the divestment of operations other than 7-Eleven. As part of a corporate restructuring, Seven & i Holdings was then established on September 1, 2005, as the parent company of 7-Eleven, Ito-Yokado, and its Denny's restaurants.

On December 26, 2005, the company announced its acquisition of Millennium Retailing holding company, parent of the Sogo and Seibu Department Stores chains; the acquisition makes Seven & i Holdings the largest distribution and retailing business in Japan.

On August 11, 2006, Seven & I purchased Lombard, Illinois-based White Hen.

On June 11, 2012, Seven & I, through its 7-Eleven, Inc. subsidiary, acquired 23 convenience stores in the US from Strasburger Enterprises, Inc.

On December 4, 2013, Seven & I purchased 44.99% ownership of Barneys Japan Co., Ltd. from "a fund operated by Tokio Marine Capital". Barneys Japan "has a network of 10 stores in Japan, including five outlet stores" and, "for the year ending February 2013, Barneys Japan posted sales of ¥19.52 billion." After this transaction, Sumitomo Corporation will continue to retain a majority stake of 50.01% in Barneys Japan Co., Ltd.

On January 29, 2014, Seven & I, through its subsidiary Seven & i Net Media, acquired 50.71% of Nissen Holdings, which is engaged in the mail order sale of clothing and daily necessities, the retail and wholesale of gift products through stores, catalogs, Internet and mobiles. Also, Nissen is involved in the life insurance, casualty insurance agency, credit card and money lending business.

On April 6, 2017, Seven & I announced they would be acquiring 1110 convenience stores from American gas company Sunoco for $3.3 billion, as well as that they would be supplied 2.2 billion gallons of fuel annually from Sunoco for 15 years. Sunoco said they would be selling 200 more stores to Seven & I in Q4, 2017.

The current President of Seven & i Holdings, Ryuichi Isaka, was appointed to that position on May 26, 2016, replacing Noritoshi Murata, who resigned his position along with Chief Executive and Chairman Toshifumi Suzuki in April 2016, after activist investor Daniel Loeb, who owns an undisclosed stake in Seven & I through his investment company Third Point, raised concerns about rumours that Suzuki was grooming his son, Yasuhiro Suzuki, as his successor.

In July 2019, 7-Eleven launched, then almost immediately suspended, a mobile payment service, 7pay. The service was hacked upon launch and attackers were able to spend money from affected customers' accounts. The service was announced to be entirely cancelled following a review of the infrastructure it ran on.

On August 2, 2020, Seven & I announced they were purchasing convenience store competitor Speedway LLC from Marathon Petroleum for $21 billion. The deal had closed on May 14, 2021.

Subsidiaries
 7-Eleven Japan (based in Japan)
 SEJ Finance and SEJ Service holding companies (based in the United States)
 7-Eleven (based in the United States and Australia)
 Speedway LLC starting the first quarter of 2021.
 Ito-Yokado
 Seven Bank
 Sogo & Seibu
 Barneys New York Japan
 Seven & i Net Media
 Nissen Holdings (50.71%)
 Stripes Convenience Stores

Senior leadership 
Seven & I has been led by a president & CEO since the founding of the group in 2005. The current president is Ryuichi Isaka, having been appointed in May 2016 after weeks of boardroom drama with his predecessor, Toshifumi Suzuki.

List of presidents and CEOs 

 Toshifumi Suzuki (2005–2016)
 Ryuichi Isaka (since May 2016)

References

External links

 Seven & i Holdings Annual Report 2011 PDF
 Seven & i Holdings Corporate Outline 2011 PDF
 Seven & i Holdings Integrated Reports / Annual Reports
 Seven & I Major Subsidiaries and Affiliates

Retail companies based in Tokyo
Companies listed on the Tokyo Stock Exchange
Japanese companies established in 2005
Japanese brands
 
Holding companies based in Tokyo
Retail companies established in 2005
Holding companies established in 2005